Alexander Goodwin Pierce is a fictional character appearing in American comic books published by Marvel Comics, usually as a supporting character in stories featuring the espionage agency S.H.I.E.L.D. as an agent.

A re-imagining of the character was portrayed by Robert Redford in the Marvel Cinematic Universe films Captain America: The Winter Soldier (2014) and Avengers: Endgame (2019).

Publication history

The character, created by Bob Harras and Paul Neary, first appeared in Nick Fury vs. S.H.I.E.L.D. #3 (August 1988).

Fictional character biography
Alexander Pierce was born on Long Island, New York, and majored at S.H.I.E.L.D. Academy in civilian surveillance, and serves in the Philadelphia Accounting Department before becoming a sleeper agent working in decoding dispatches from HYDRA. After escaping death in an ambush at HYDRA's Hong Kong base, Pierce accompanied Nick Fury to the Himalayas, along with their prisoner Madame Hydra. Unable to withstand the bitter cold, they were seized by robotic duplicates called "Deltites" and brought to S.H.I.E.L.D.'s orbiting satellite. Aided by Madame Hydra, Pierce and a group of S.H.I.E.L.D. agents escaped and took part in the battle that led to the Deltites' destruction. 

Following the subsequent disbanding of S.H.I.E.L.D., Pierce served as caretaker of the S.H.I.E.L.D. skyscraper that once served as its headquarters. He was then contacted for help by Nick Fury aid him and his allies in vanquishing the Death's Head Squad. He has since joined the new version of S.H.I.E.L.D. Fury has organized. 

Pierce later appears as the Secret Warriors' leader following Secret War. Pierce was given command of Team Black, consisting of the most dangerous and unruly recruits on the Caterpillar list of young super-humans. The team was ordered to gather intelligence on Hydra. Pierce brought his team in for a joint attack with the Howling Commandos on Hell's Heaven, stronghold deep within China. The mission was successful, but after Pierce pulled Team Black out, additional Hydra forces attacked and wiped out the Commandos. Pierce and his team survived and was all folded into a new United Nations sanctioned S.H.I.E.L.D. created by Fury and run by Daisy Johnson/Quake.

Other versions

Mutant X
In the Mutant X reality, Alexander Pierce along other S.H.I.E.L.D. Agents fought Havok and The Six (X-Men) atop the Statue of Liberty where S.H.I.E.L.D. planned to release the Legacy Virus to kill all super-human life.

In other media

Television
Alexander Pierce appeared in the television film Nick Fury: Agent of S.H.I.E.L.D., portrayed by Neil Roberts. This version is a British recruit assigned to the eponymous character following their exile from S.H.I.E.L.D. under Jack Pincer.

Film
Robert Redford portrays Alexander Pierce in films set in the Marvel Cinematic Universe. This version is the secretary of the World Security Council, Nick Fury's close friend, director of a Hydra cell within S.H.I.E.L.D., and the Winter Soldier's handler.
 Pierce is introduced in Captain America: The Winter Soldier (2014). He masterminds Project Insight ostensibly in an effort to recognize and apprehend criminals and terrorists prior to committing misdeeds via three Helicarriers. In actuality, Pierce's plan is to carry out mass assassinations of citizens recognized as a threat to Hydra based on Arnim Zola's algorithm to force the world into submission. When Pierce learned Fury was investigating Project Insight's confidential files, he dispatched the Winter Soldier to eliminate Fury and Steve Rogers. However, Pierce's plan is foiled by Rogers, Natasha Romanoff, Sam Wilson, Fury, and S.H.I.E.L.D. loyalists before Pierce is killed by Fury.
 An alternate timeline version of Pierce makes a cameo appearance in Avengers: Endgame (2019).

References

External links
 Alexander Goodwin Pierce at Marvel Wiki

Characters created by Bob Harras
Characters created by Paul Neary
Comics characters introduced in 1988
Fictional bodyguards
Fictional characters from New York (state)
Fictional politicians
Fictional special forces personnel
Fictional spymasters
Fictional United States Secretaries of Defense
S.H.I.E.L.D. agents